Seetharamapalya is an upcoming metro station on the east-west corridor of the Purple Line of Namma Metro. Around this station, holds the IFB Automotive Pvt. Ltd. followed by some locations like Fairfield by Marriott Hotel, IFB Industries and many more. This station is planned to be operational in December 2022.

The Whitefield - KR Puram trial runs were successfully conducted from 25 October for a month. This section will become operational from March 25 2023.

Station Layout
Station Layout - To Be Confirmed

Entry/Exit

See also
Bangalore
List of Namma Metro stations
Transport in Karnataka
List of metro systems
List of rapid transit systems in India
Bangalore Metropolitan Transport Corporation

References

External links
 BMRCL English - BMRCL Official Website
 UrbanRail.Net – descriptions of all metro systems in the world, each with a schematic map showing all stations.



Namma Metro stations
Railway stations in India opened in 2011
2011 establishments in Karnataka